Zhenyuan may refer to:

Places in China 
Zhenyuan County, Gansu, a county in Gansu
Zhenyuan County, Guizhou, a county in Qiandongnan Miao and Dong Autonomous Prefecture, Guizhou
Zhenyuan Yi, Hani and Lahu Autonomous County, a county in Yunnan
Zhenyuan, Shaanxi (贞元), a town in Wugong County, Shaanxi
Zhenyuan Subdistrict (真源街道), a subdistrict in Luyi County, Henan

Historical eras
Zhenyuan (貞元, 785–805), era name used by Emperor Dezong of Tang
Zhenyuan (貞元, 1153–1156), era name used by Wanyan Liang, emperor of the Jin dynasty

Other ues
Chinese ironclad Zhenyuan, a Qing dynasty turret ship which was captured by the Japanese during the Sino-Japanese War (1894)
Zhenyuan (真圓, 1579-1648), a Chinese monk who traveled to Japan